"I'm Jealous" is a 1995 song by the Australian band Divinyls.

I'm Jealous may also refer to:

 "I'm Jealous" (Ike & Tina Turner song), 1961
 "I'm Jealous", a song by Shania Twain from the album Up!, 2002
 "Baby, I'm Jealous", a 2020 song by Bebe Rexha and Doja Cat

See also 
 Jealous (disambiguation)